6235 Burney, provisional designation , is a Florian or background asteroid from the inner regions of the asteroid belt, approximately  in diameter. It was discovered on 14 November 1987, by Japanese astronomers Seiji Ueda and Hiroshi Kaneda at the Kushiro Observatory on Hokkaido, Japan. The likely elongated L-type asteroid has a rotation period of 15.5 hours. It was named for Venetia Burney, who first proposed 's name.

Orbit and classification 

Burney is a non-family asteroid of the main belt's background population when applying the hierarchical clustering method to its proper orbital elements. In the HCM assessment by Zappala and based on osculating Keplerian orbital elements, the asteroid has also been classified as a member of the Flora family, a giant asteroid family and the largest family of stony asteroids in the main-belt.

It orbits the Sun in the inner asteroid belt at a distance of 1.9–2.6 AU once every 3 years and 4 months (1,226 days; semi-major axis of 2.24 AU). Its orbit has an eccentricity of 0.14 and an inclination of 3° with respect to the ecliptic.

Physical characteristics 

Burney has been characterized as an L-type asteroid by Pan-STARRS survey and in the SDSS-based taxonomy. It is also an assumed S-type.

Rotation period 

In December 2004, a rotational lightcurve of Burney was obtained from photometric observations by Donald Pray at the Carbuncle Hill Observatory . Lightcurve analysis gave a well-defined rotation period of 15.515 hours with a brightness variation of 0.60 magnitude. The Wide-field Infrared Survey Explorer (WISE) also measured a high amplitude 0.71 and 0.95 magnitude, which indicates that asteroid has an elongated shape.

Diameter and albedo 

According to the survey carried out by the NEOWISE mission of NASA's WISE telescope, Burney measures between 3.64 and 4.083 kilometers in diameter and its surface has an albedo between 0.29 and 0.36.

The Collaborative Asteroid Lightcurve Link assumes an albedo of 0.24 – derived from 8 Flora, the parent body of the Flora family – and calculates a diameter of 4.50 kilometers based on an absolute magnitude of 13.9.

Naming 

This minor planet was named after Venetia Burney (1918–2009) who, as a girl of eleven, first suggested the mythological name Pluto – the Roman God of the Underworld who was able to make himself invisible – for the dwarf planet , then considered the ninth planet in the Solar System. The naming of the asteroid "Burney" was not suggested by the asteroid discoverers. It was designated by the Working Group for Small Bodies Nomenclature (SBN) of Division III (Planetary Systems Sciences) of the International Astronomical Union. The official naming citation was published by the Minor Planet Center on 15 December 2005.

Notes

References

External links 
 Asteroid Lightcurve Database (LCDB), query form (info )
 Dictionary of Minor Planet Names, Google books
 Discovery Circumstances: Numbered Minor Planets (5001)-(10000) – Minor Planet Center
 
 

006235
006235
Discoveries by Seiji Ueda
Discoveries by Hiroshi Kaneda
Named minor planets
19871114